The 1933 Invercargill mayoral election was part of the New Zealand local elections held that same year. The polling was conducted using the standard first-past-the-post electoral method. This was the final mayoral election for a biennial term, future terms would be triennial.

Incumbent mayor John Miller defeated former mayor John D. Campbell again for his second consecutive term, the third in total.

Results
The following table gives the election results:

References

1933 elections in New Zealand
Mayoral elections in Invercargill